Júlio Prestes de Albuquerque (
15 March 1882 – 9 February 1946) was a Brazilian poet, lawyer and politician. He was the last elected President of Brazil of the period known as the Old Republic, but never took office because the government was overthrown in the Revolution of 1930. Prestes was the only politician to be elected President of Brazil and then impeded from taking office. He was also the last person born in São Paulo to be elected president until the election of Jair Bolsonaro in 2018.

On 23 June 1930, he became the second Brazilian featured on the cover of Time magazine.

Early career
Prestes graduated with a law degree from the Law School of São Paulo (today the Faculty of Law of the University of São Paulo) in 1906. He married Alice Viana and had three children with her.

He started his political career in 1909, when he was elected State Representative in São Paulo by the Republican Party of São Paulo (PRP). He was re-elected several times until 1923, and became noted for his defense of public employees in São Paulo.

As a State Representative, he introduced legislation that created the Court of Auditors of São Paulo and the Faculty of Veterinary Medicine and Zootechnology of the University of São Paulo. He was the author of the law that incorporated the Sorocabana Railroad in the São Paulo State patrimony.

In the Revolution of 1924, Prestes fought on the Coluna Sul, with Ataliba Leonel and Washington Luís, expelling the rebels of the region of Sorocaba.

References

External links

 

|-

1882 births
1946 deaths
People from São Paulo (state)
Brazilian people of Portuguese descent
Republican Party of São Paulo politicians
National Democratic Union (Brazil) politicians
Presidents of Brazil
Governors of São Paulo (state)
Brazilian Freemasons
University of São Paulo alumni